Schoolhouse and School House may refer to:

 School building
 House system
 One-room schools or Two-room schools, usually historic, and termed "schoolhouses" in the United States
 Schoolhouse Home Education Association
 Schoolhouse Rock!
School House, West Virginia
The Schoolhouse, a mid-19th century public school building used as a performance space 2001–2005 in Hadley, Massachusetts
The School House, an early American television program broadcast on the DuMont Television Network in 1949